Lopidea nigridia is a species of plant bug in the family Miridae. It is found in North America.

Subspecies
These three subspecies belong to the species Lopidea nigridia:
 Lopidea nigridia aculeata Van Duzee, 1917
 Lopidea nigridia nigridia Uhler, 1895
 Lopidea nigridia serica Knight, 1923

References

Further reading

 
 
 

Articles created by Qbugbot
Insects described in 1895
Orthotylini